Macrocneme thyridia is a moth of the subfamily Arctiinae. It was described by George Hampson in 1898. It is found in Suriname.

References

 

Macrocneme
Moths described in 1898